Jean Bertaut (1552 – 8 June 1611), French poet, was born at Caen.

Life
He figures with Philippe Desportes in the disdainful couplet of Boileau on Ronsard:
"Ce poëte orgueilleux, trébuché de si haut,
Rendit plus retenus Desportes et Bertaut."
He wrote light verse to celebrate the incidents of court life in the manner of Desportes, but his verse is more fantastic and fuller of conceits than his master's. He early entered the church, and had a share in the conversion of Henry IV, a circumstance which assured his career.

After his elevation to the bishopric he ceased to produce the light verse in which he excelled, though his scruples did not prevent him from preparing a new edition of his Recueil de quelques vers amoureux (1602) in 1606. The serious poems in which he celebrated the public events of his later years are dull and lifeless. Bertaut died at Sées on 8 June 1611. His works were edited by Adolphe Chenevière in 1891.

References

Attribution

1552 births
1611 deaths
Clergy from Caen
16th-century French poets
17th-century French Roman Catholic bishops
Bishops of Sées
French male poets
Writers from Caen